John William "Jack" McKenzie (born July 22, 1930) is a Canadian retired ice hockey player who competed in the 1956 Winter Olympics. McKenzie was a member of the Kitchener-Waterloo Dutchmen who won the bronze medal for Canada in ice hockey at the 1956 Winter Olympics. He played in eight matches and scored seven goals.

References

External links

Jack McKenzie's profile at SportsReference.com

1930 births
Living people
Canadian ice hockey defencemen
Olympic ice hockey players of Canada
Ice hockey players at the 1956 Winter Olympics
Olympic bronze medalists for Canada
Olympic medalists in ice hockey
Medalists at the 1956 Winter Olympics